AdventHealth station is a train station in Orlando, Florida, serving SunRail, the commuter rail service of Central Florida. The northernmost SunRail stop in the City of Orlando, the station opened May 1, 2014, and was built along tracks originally used by the South Florida Railroad. 

The station is designed to serve AdventHealth Orlando. It has two platforms, two tracks, and the only parking is at the existing parking garages on the hospital grounds. The station is officially located at 500 Rollins Street, however the platforms extend as far south as East Princeton Street.

Of the four SunRail stations in Orlando, AdventHealth is the only station built exclusively from scratch. It is typical of most SunRail stations featuring canopies consisting of white aluminum poles supporting sloped green roofs and includes ticket vending machines, ticket validators, emergency call boxes, drinking fountains, and separate platforms designed for passengers needing wheelchairs, a feature that's quite useful being at a hospital. 

In July 2014, Florida Hospital made the rail crossings in Florida Hospital Health Village a rail quiet zone. Florida Hospital had extra crossing arms and medians installed to stop motor vehicles and pedestrians from crossing the gate when it is down. In December 2014, Orlando was looking for local artists to create an art piece for Florida Hospital SunRail station. An artist was chosen to create a 41 by 13-foot-tall hand-painted mural for $50,000, which was installed on December, 2016.

References

External links

Florida Hospital Health Village SunRail Station (Official Site)
Florida Hospital Health Village

SunRail stations
Railway stations in the United States opened in 2014
Transportation in Orlando, Florida
2014 establishments in Florida
Transportation buildings and structures in Orange County, Florida
AdventHealth